Ballindoon Bridge halt was a railcar request stop which served the area of Cappry in County Donegal, Ireland.

The halt opened on 1 August 1944 on the Donegal Railway Company line from Glenties to Stranorlar.

It closed on 15 December 1947 when the County Donegal Railways Joint Committee  closed the line from Glenties to Stranorlar in an effort to save money.

Freight services on the route continued until 10 March 1952.

References

Disused railway stations in County Donegal
Railway stations opened in 1944
Railway stations closed in 1947